Shambala is a town and the seat of Xiangcheng County, southwestern Garzê Tibetan Autonomous Prefecture, western Sichuan province of southwest China. Before 2005, it was called Sangpi.

References 

Xiangcheng County, Sichuan
Towns in Sichuan